The Musical Jigsaw Play is a 1994 family musical by Alan Ayckbourn and John Pattison. It is set in a strange word where bad pop groups go, and the play involves help from the audience in solving puzzles to escape. Unlike most Ayckbourn plays, this play was only produced once, largely due to the technical demands and lack of suitability for end-stage theatres.

References

External links
 The Musical Jigsaw Play on official Ayckbourn site

Plays by Alan Ayckbourn
1994 plays